Maternidad is a Caracas Metro station on Line 2. It was opened on 6 November 1988 as part of the extension of the line from La Paz to El Silencio. The station is between Capuchinos and Artigas.

References

Caracas Metro stations
1988 establishments in Venezuela
Railway stations opened in 1988